American Airlines Flight 2 was a Douglas DC-3 that crashed into the Mississippi River on February 10, 1944. All twenty-four passengers and crew were killed. The ultimate cause of the crash remains a mystery.

Flight and aircraft

Flight 2 was a domestic scheduled passenger flight between Little Rock National Airport in Little Rock, Arkansas and Memphis Municipal Airport in Memphis, Tennessee. The aircraft was a DC-3-277A manufactured by the Douglas Aircraft Company and operated by American Airlines. The craft was five years old, having first entered service in 1939, and had accumulated a total of 12,446 hours of flight time at the time of the crash.

The plane departed Little Rock National Airport with three crew and twenty-one passengers on board. There was no abnormal radio contact prior to the crash. All twenty-four people on the DC-3 were killed.

Investigation

The Civil Aeronautics Board investigated the crash, but was unable to determine the probable cause of the accident. The report that was subsequently issued stated that the investigation would continue and a supplemental report would be issued as to their findings, but no such report was ever filed.

Flight 2 today

, Flight 2 is used on the Los Angeles-New York City (JFK) route, contrary to the convention of retiring flight numbers that have crashed.

See also 
 American Airlines
 American Airlines accidents and incidents
 List of accidents and incidents involving commercial aircraft

References

External links
 Accident report of the Civil Aeronautics Board (PDF)

Aviation accidents and incidents in the United States in 1944
2
Airliner accidents and incidents in Tennessee
Accidents and incidents involving the Douglas DC-3
1944 in Tennessee